Everything You See is the thirteenth album by the Scottish Celtic rock band Runrig, released by Ridge Records in the United Kingdom on 14 May 2007. All songs were written by band members Calum and Rory Macdonald, except for "Sona" and "And the Accordions Played", which they co-wrote with fellow band members Malcolm Jones and Brian Hurren, respectively. As on all Runrig albums, several songs are written and performed in Scottish Gaelic, underlining the band's heritage.

In Summer 2007, the band went on their Everything You See tour, promoting their newest album as well as older songs. The tour's main focus was Denmark (the track "In Scandinavia" commemorates the ancient link between Denmark and Scotland), Germany, and England, with originally only one concert being held in Scotland (at Drumnadrochit by Loch Ness).  The tour was later extended to include several Scottish dates.  The Loch Ness concert, entitled Beat the Drum after the chorus to the song "Pride of the Summer", was released on DVD and CD as Year of the Flood in 2008.

Track listing
 "Year of the Flood" - 4:10
 "Road Trip" - 4:24
 "Clash of the Ash" - 3:16
 "The Ocean Road" - 6:32
 "Atoms" - 4:51
 "An Dealachadh" (The Parting) - 3:08
 "This Day" - 4:22
 "Sona" (Joyful) - 4:55
 "Something's Got to Give" - 3:21
 "And the Accordions Played" - 4:58
 "In Scandinavia" - 4:54

Personnel
Runrig
Iain Bayne - drums
Bruce Guthro - lead vocals
Brian Hurren - keyboards, vocals
Malcolm Jones - guitars, bouzouki, pipes, accordion, mandolin
Calum Macdonald - percussion
Rory Macdonald - vocals, bass guitar, accordion

Runrig albums
2007 albums
Scottish Gaelic music